The SkyDome Cup was a soccer tournament played in late January 1995 in the SkyDome stadium (now Rogers Centre) between hosts Canada, then European champions Denmark, and Portugal. As the tournament was played in a crucial part of the European leagues the European sides presented alternate sides (Denmark consisting of a Danish League XI), which resulted in the only (or first) international caps for some of players involved.

Played January 24, the first match put hosts Canada against Denmark, and resulted in a one-nil win for the European champions with a goal by Højer Nielsen. Canada would play their second game two days later against Portugal, which resulted in a one-goal draw, with goals by António Folha and Alex Bunbury.

With Canada out of the race with 1 point in their two matches, the winner would be known in the final game, played January 29 between Denmark (who only needed a draw) and Portugal. Paulo Alves scored late in the game, giving Portugal their first victory at senior level.

Final standings

Results

Canada vs Denmark

Canada vs Portugal

Portugal vs Denmark

Statistics

Goalscorers

See also
U.S. Cup
1988 Matthews Cup

References

External links
Complete information in RSSSF.com

1995
1995 in Canadian soccer
1994–95 in Portuguese football
1994–95 in Danish football
Soccer in Toronto
1995 in Toronto